"Don't Believe Anymore" is a single by Australian band Icehouse. It is the second single from their third album, Sidewalk. It was released on 15 June 1984 in the UK and on 2 July 1984 in Australia. It peaked at No. 31 on the Australian singles chart.

Charts

The Whitlams version

Australian band the Whitlams cover the song and released in it June 2003 as the fourth and final single from their fifth album, Torch the Moon. It peaked at number 47 on the Australian ARIA singles chart. The track "Je N'y Crois Plus" is a French-language version of the song, since Tim Freedman is a fluent speaker of the language.

Track listing
 "Don't Believe Anymore" [single version] – 3:50
 "Don't Believe Anymore" [full version] – 5:26
 "Je N'y Crois Plus" – 3:48

Charts

References

1984 singles
1984 songs
2003 singles
Icehouse (band) songs
The Whitlams songs
Songs written by Iva Davies
Chrysalis Records singles
Regular Records singles